Yarensky Uyezd was one of the subdivisions of the Vologda Governorate of the Russian Empire. It was situated in the northern part of the governorate. Its administrative centre was Yarensk.

Demographics
At the time of the Russian Empire Census of 1897, Yarensky Uyezd had a population of 172,187. Of these, 68.9% spoke Komi-Zyryan and 30.9% Russian as their native language.

References

 
Uezds of Vologda Governorate
Vologda Governorate